Lieutenant Nicole "Nikki" (Nav) Caetano is a fictional TV character on the show Sea Patrol. She is portrayed by Saskia Burmeister.

History 

Nicole Caetano (also Nikki or Nav) was the ships navigator on-board HMAS Hammersley.

Personal life
In season one, Nikki started a relationship with fellow shipmate ET. At the end of the season, ET takes a transfer off the ship so that he and Nikki can openly pursue a relationship.

In season two, Mike Flynn asks for an electronics technician to be posted about Hammersley due to multiple errors, and ET is asked personally by Cmdr Steve Marshall to be transferred back to Hammersley. ET reluctantly accepts as he knows refusing to take a Cairns posting as he wanted would create suspicion, but Nikki is mad at him for not refusing and does her best to avoid even talking to him for several episodes.

After a hostage situation aboard Hammersley (Takedown), Nikki starts to cool down as she admits she is happy to have him around, even though they can't be more than friends at that time. In Birds, the Hammersley crew then encounter Campbell Fulton, a Marine Wildlife Officer who tries to force himself on Nikki, but she rebuffs him. He then threatens her by revealing he knows about her and ET, and will tell if she tells anyone about his assault. Later Campbell and ET come to blows over Nikki and Campbell pushes ET into a ships hold.

ET is trapped under a heavy pipe in a flooding ship and Nikki is the one to try and reassure him. XO then realises that the feelings between Nikki and ET are more than friendly as Nikki struggles to hold it together at the prospect of losing ET. Her feelings are soon made apparent to the rest of the crew when she learns the only feasible way of saving him is to amputate his leg. She stops Swain from touching ET and instead offers a last-ditch solution which results in ET being freed and recovering.

When the XO finds out about Nikki and ETs secret love affair, she takes it professionally but decides not to say anything because of the friendship that XO and Nikki find between themselves. Nikki reveals vague details about Fultons attack to XO, which eventually leads to Fulton confronting Nikki, but she turns the tables by threatening to have him charged with ETs attempted murder. However Campbell is dismissed as a result of Mike Flynn reporting him for assault.

When ET gives her a clown fish and proposes to her, she is overcome, but begins to worry when ET misses the ship, after it had been crash sailed. When it's discovered ET was murdered along with the rest of his workmates on a diving boat, Nav is heartbroken and is tearful for most of the episode.

Throughout season three, Nikki became dangerously obsessive with proving that ET was murdered. When Nikki learns that ET was poisoned by having his air supply sabotaged, She soon centers her investigation on Matt and Simone Robsenn, who are operating an oil theft ring. Nikki soon discovers that the Robsenns are working with old rival Campbell Fulton. Hammersley rescues Fulton from near death after the Robsenns try to kill him to buy them time, using the same technique of sabotaging his airway.

Nikki confronts Campbell Fulton to get him to reveal that he was responsible for ETs death: He started working for the Robsenns and when ET joined the dive team, he recognised him from his past experiences with Hammersley. To prevent word of their activities from reaching authorities, the Robsenns orchestrated the deaths of the dive team including ET, but it was Fulton who sabotaged their airways.

Awards

References

Sea Patrol characters
Fictional military lieutenants
Fictional Royal Australian Navy personnel